Texas Instruments
Embedded systems
System software
StarterWare is a free software package provided by Texas Instruments. StarterWare is intended to provide embedded system developers with a starting point that does not require the use of an operating system. It is designed for easy migration between TI embedded devices.